The 2012 Firestone 550 was the twenty-second running of the Firestone 550 and the seventh round of the 2012 IndyCar Series season. It took place on Saturday, June 9, 2012. The race was contested over 228 laps at the  Texas Motor Speedway in Fort Worth, Texas, and was telecasted by NBC Sports in the United States.

The reigning champion of the Firestone 550 was Ryan Briscoe, who won the 2010 race, as in 2011 the event contested over two races in one night, making it the Firestone Twin 275s. The race was won by Justin Wilson of Dale Coyne Racing.



Classification

Starting grid

Race results

Notes
 Points include 1 point for pole position and 2 points for most laps led.

Standings after the race

Drivers' Championship

Manufacturers' Championship

Note: Only the top five positions are included for the driver standings.

References

External links

Firestone 600
Firestone 550
Firestone 550
Firestone 550